Lowly Worm is a fictional character created by Richard Scarry; he frequently appears in children's books by Scarry, and is a main character in the animated series The Busy World of Richard Scarry and Busytown Mysteries. In The Busy World of Richard Scarry, he is voiced by Keith Knight. In Busytown Mysteries, he is voiced by Paul Wensley.

Lowly is an anthropomorphic earthworm. He usually wears a dark green Tyrolean hat on his head, similar to the hat which Richard Scarry purchased in St. Anton in 1950 and often wore during visits to his publishers in New York City. Lowly also wears a shoe on the end of his tail, a blue and green tube on his body (intended to resemble a sleeveless shirt and one-legged trousers) over a singular "underpant" that covers his clitellum, and a red bow tie. His best friend is Huckle Cat, he lives in Busytown, and he drives an apple-shaped car. In various episodes of The Busy World of Richard Scarry and Busytown Mysteries and in the computer games Richard Scarry's Busytown and How Things Work in Busytown it is revealed that the car can also fly much like a helicopter.

Lowly attends school with Huckle and plays with him and his friends, but also takes part in more adult activities, such as driving a car. Hilda Hippo also has a crush on him, which he is reluctant to return, although he does consider Hilda a good friend.

A Variety reviewer of The Busy World of Richard Scarry describes Lowly as "the real star of the series, with his goofily deprecating name and natty ensemble that includes a bow tie and single sneaker". According to Scarry's widow, Lowly was his favorite fictional creation.

About 500,000 Lowly Worm and Huckle Cat finger puppets, distributed by American fast food chain Taco Bell in 1993, were voluntarily recalled by Taco Bell following complaints that the puppets had become stuck to children's tongues.

References

Fictional worms
Television sidekicks
Characters in children's literature